The Coaticook Gorge is a gorge in Coaticook, Quebec, Canada in the Estrie region. The Coaticook River runs through it.

References

Canyons and gorges of Quebec
Landforms of Estrie
Tourist attractions in Estrie